Chen Jiayuan (born 16 February 1991) is a Singaporean former badminton player of Chinese descent.

Early life 
The Fujian born player joined the Singapore national badminton team in 2005 and, in 2009, officially become a Singaporean citizen.

Career 
In 2010, she won the women's singles title at the Singapore International and in 2014 she won the Malaysia International Challenge tournament.

Achievements

BWF International Challenge/Series 
Women's singles

  BWF International Challenge tournament
  BWF International Series tournament

References

External links 
 

1991 births
Living people
Badminton players from Fujian
Singaporean female badminton players
Singaporean people of Chinese descent
Competitors at the 2011 Southeast Asian Games
Competitors at the 2013 Southeast Asian Games
Competitors at the 2015 Southeast Asian Games
Southeast Asian Games bronze medalists for Singapore
Southeast Asian Games medalists in badminton
21st-century Singaporean women